French people in Lebanon (or French Lebanese) are French citizens resident in Lebanon, including many binationals and persons of mixed ancestry. French statistics estimated that there were around 21,500 French citizens living in Lebanon in 2011. There are neither official Lebanese statistics nor any scientific information regarding their spoken languages and supposed religious affiliations.

Political representation
For the elections at the Assembly of French Citizens Abroad, Lebanon is part of the Beirut electoral district, including also Syria, Iraq and Jordan, where there are small French communities. The three representatives elected on 18 June 2006 (4,156 votes in total, 3,787 in Lebanon) are all members of right-wing groups in the Assembly: Jean-Louis Mainguy (born in 1953 in Beirut, Union of Democrats, Independents and Liberals), Denise Revers-Haddad (born in 1940 in Varennes-Jarcy, Rally of French Citizens Abroad) and Marcel Laugel (born in 1931 in Algiers, then French Algeria, Union of Democrats, Independents and Liberals).

For the June 2012 French legislative election, Lebanon is part of a large constituency for French residents overseas, the tenth, including Central, Eastern and Southern Africa and much of the Middle East. On December 31, 2011 there were 21,428 registered French electors in Lebanon out of 147,997 for the whole constituency. Out of 11 candidates presently known, only two are - at least partially - living in Lebanon, none from the two main parties.

French Lebanese in France

At the French National Assembly, there were two French Lebanese deputies for the 2007-2012 mandate, Henri Jibrayel (member of the Socialist Party) and Élie Aboud (born in Beirut in 1959, member of the Union for a Popular Movement). In the 2007-2012 Union for a Popular Movement governments, there was a French Lebanese member, Éric Besson, whose mother is Lebanese.

See also
 Count of Tripoli
 French Mandate of Syria and the Lebanon
 Lebanon
 France
 French Empire
 France–Lebanon relations
 French diaspora
 Lebanese people in France
 Latin Church in Lebanon
 French language in Lebanon
 Latin Church in the Middle East

References

Lebanon
 
Ethnic groups in Lebanon